Vesdare (or Wesdare) is a small village in Parner taluka in Ahmednagar district of state of Maharashtra, India.

Religion
The majority of the population in the village i.e. almost 100 percent population is Hindu and majority of them are 96k Maratha.

Economy
The majority of the population have farming as their primary occupation. Village is also known as "Village of Teachers" since there are also a good quantity of people in the village with occupation of teaching. Also, a few people have private jobs in Mumbai and Pune.

See also
 Villages in Parner taluka

References 

Villages in Parner taluka
Villages in Ahmednagar district